Cephalogonimidae is a family of trematode parasites characterized by a genital pore located anterior to the oral sucker, at the apex of the body.

Classification 
This family comprises two genera containing of a number of species.

Cephalogonimoides
Cephalogonimoides sireni Premvati, 1969
Cephalogonimus
Cephalogonimus americanus Stafford, 1902
Cephalogonimus amphiumae Chandler, 1923
Cephalogonimus brevicirrus Ingles, 1932
Cephalogonimus europaeus Blaizot, 1910
Cephalogonimus heteropneustes Gupta, 1951
Cephalogonimus lenoiri (Poirier 1886)
Cephalogonimus retusus (Dujardin, 1845)
Cephalogonimus salamandrus Dronen and Lang, 1974
Cephalogonimus vesicaudus Nickerson, 1912
 Emoleptalea
 Emoleptalea dollfusi Srivastava, 1960
 Emoleptalea hardayali Kumar and Agrawal, 1963
 Emoleptalea horai Gupta, 1955
 Emoleptalea kanungoi Agrawal and Agrawal, 1985
 Emoleptalea loosi Srivastava, 1960
 Emoleptalea rifaati Ramadan, Saoud, and Taha, 1987
 Emoleptalea synodontidos Dollfus, 1950
 Masenia
Masenia bangweulensis Beverly-Burton, 1962
Masenia carangai Gupta and Tandon, 1985
Masenia collata Chatterji, 1933
Masenia dayali (Gupta, 1955)
Masenia gomtia Agrawal and Agrawal, 1985
Masenia kwangtungensis Pan, 1984
Masenia moradabadensis Srivastava, 1960
Masenia orissai Gupta and Tandon, 1985
Masenia quiloni (Gupta and Tandon, 1985)
Masenia synodontis Khalil and Thurston, 1973
Masenia upeneusi Gupta and Puri, 1984
Masenia vittatusi Agrawal, 1963

References 

Plagiorchiida
Platyhelminthes families